Rachel Chiesley (baptised 4 February 1679 – 12 May 1745), usually known as Lady Grange, was the wife of Lord Grange, a Scottish lawyer with Jacobite sympathies. After 25 years of marriage and nine children, the Granges separated acrimoniously. When Lady Grange produced letters that she claimed were evidence of his treasonable plottings against the Hanoverian government in London, her husband had her kidnapped in 1732. She was incarcerated in various remote locations on the western seaboard of Scotland, including the Monach Isles, Skye and St Kilda.

Lady Grange's father was convicted of murder and she is known to have had a violent temper; initially her absence seems to have caused little comment. News of her plight eventually reached her home town of Edinburgh and an unsuccessful rescue attempt was undertaken by her lawyer, Thomas Hope of Rankeillor. She died in captivity, after being in effect imprisoned for over 13 years. Her life has been remembered in poetry, prose and plays.

Early years 

Rachel Chiesley was one of ten children born to John Chiesley of Dalry and Margaret Nicholson. Her parents' marriage was unhappy and Margaret took her husband to court for aliment. She was awarded 1,700 merks by Sir George Lockhart of Carnwath, the Lord President of the Court of Session. Furious with the result,  John Chiesley shot Lockhart dead on the High Street of Edinburgh as he walked home from church on Easter Sunday, 31 March 1689. He made no attempt to escape and confessed at his trial, held before the Lord Provost the next day. Two days later he was taken from the Tolbooth to the Mercat Cross on the High Street. His right hand was cut off before he was hanged, and the pistol he had used for the murder was placed around his neck. Rachel Chiesley's birthday is unknown but she was baptised on 4 February 1679 and was probably born shortly before then, making her about ten years old at the time of her father's execution.

Marriage and children 

The date of Chiesley's marriage to James Erskine is uncertain: based on the text of a letter she wrote much later in life, it may have been in 1707 when she was about 28. Erskine was the younger son of Charles Erskine, Earl of Mar and in 1689 his older brother John Erskine, became Earl of Mar on their father's death. These were politically troubled times; the Jacobite cause was still popular in many parts of Scotland, and the younger Earl was nicknamed "Bobbing John" for his varied manoeuverings. After playing a prominent role in the Jacobite rising of 1715 he was stripped of his title, sent into exile, and never returned to Scotland.

The young Lady Grange has been described as a "wild beauty", and it is likely the marriage only took place after she became pregnant. This uncertain background notwithstanding, Lord and Lady Grange led a superficially uneventful domestic life. They divided their time between a town house at the foot of Niddry's Wynd off the High Street in Edinburgh and an estate at Preston (now part of Prestonpans in East Lothian), where Lady Grange was the factor (or supervisor) for a time. Her husband was a successful lawyer, becoming Lord Justice Clerk in 1710, and the marriage produced nine children:
 Charlie, born August 1709.
 Johnie, born March 1711, died age two months.
 James, born March 1713. He married his uncle "Bobbing" John's daughter Frances. Their son John eventually became Earl of Mar after the title was restored.
 Mary, born July 1714, who married John Keith the 3rd Earl of Kintore in August 1729.
 Meggie, who died young in May 1717.
 Fannie, born December 1716.
 Jeannie, born in December 1717.
 Rachel.
 John.

In addition, Lady Grange miscarried twice and one of the above children is known to have died in 1721.

Acrimony and separation 
There was evidently an element of discord in the marriage that eventually became public knowledge. In late 1717 or early 1718, Erskine received warnings from a friend that he had enemies in the government.  At about the same time one of the children's tutors recorded in his diary that Lady Grange was "imperious with an unreasonable temper". Her outbursts were evidently also capable of frightening her younger daughters and after Lady Grange's kidnapping, no action was ever taken on her behalf by any of her children, the eldest of whom would have been in their early twenties when she was abducted.  Macaulay writes that "[t]he calm acceptance by the family of their mother's disappearance would persuade many that it need not be a matter of concern to them either". This restraint may have been influenced by the fact their mother had previously disinherited all of them when the youngest were still infants, an outcome described as "unnatural" by the Sobieski Stuarts, two English brothers who claimed descent from Prince Charles Edward Stuart.

As the Erskines' marriage trouble increased, Lady Grange's behaviour became increasingly unpredictable. In 1730, the factorship of the Preston estate was removed from her, further increasing her angst. Her discovery of an affair her husband was conducting with coffeehouse owner Fanny Lindsay can only have made matters worse. In April of that year, she threatened suicide and to run naked through the streets of Edinburgh. She may have kept a razor under her pillow and attempted to intimidate her husband by reminding him whose daughter she was. On 27 July, she signed a formal letter of separation from James Erskine but things did not improve. For example, she barracked her husband in the street and in church and he and one of their children were forced to hide from her in a tavern for two hours or more on one occasion. She intercepted one of his letters and took it to the authorities alleging it was evidence of treason. She is also said to have stood outside the house in Niddry's Wynd, waving the letter and shouting obscenities on at least two occasions. In January 1732 she booked a stagecoach to London and James Erskine and his friends, afraid her presence there would cause them further trouble, decided it was time to take decisive action.

Kidnap 

Lady Grange was abducted from her temporary home of lodgings on Niddrys Wynd off the Royal Mile on the night of 22 January 1732 by two Highland lairds, Roderick MacLeod of Berneray and Macdonald of Morar, and several of their men. After a bloody struggle, in which they knocked out several of her teeth, she was blindfolded and taken out of the city in a waiting sedan chair occupied by Alexander Foster of Carsebonny. Going northwards they transferred out of the sedan chair near Multres Hill (now St Andrew Square) and then taken on horseback westward to the house of John Macleod, advocate at Muiravonside, west of Linlithgow for a night. She was next taken northwards to Wester Polmaise near Falkirk, where she was held until 15 August on the ground floor of an uninhabited tower. She was by then over fifty years old.

From there she was taken west by Peter Fraser (a page of Lord Lovat) and his men through Perthshire. At Balquhidder, according to MacGregor tradition, she was entertained in the great hall, provided with a meal of venison, and slept on a heather bed covered with deerskins.  The existence of St Fillan's Pool on the River Fillan near Tyndrum would have provided useful cover for her captors: it was regularly used as a cure for insanity, which would have helped to explain her presence to the curious. The details of the onward route from there are not clear but it is likely she was taken through Glen Coe to Loch Ness and then through Glen Garry to Loch Hourn on the west coast. After a short delay she was then put on board ship to Heisker the main isle of the Monach Isles. The difficulty of her position must have quickly become evident. She was in the company of men whose loyalty was to clan chieftains rather than the law, and few of them spoke any English at all.  Their native Gaelic would have been incomprehensible to her, although as her years of captivity wore on she slowly learned something of the language. She complained that young members of the local aristocracy visited her as she waited by the shores of Loch Hourn, but that "they came with design to see me, but not to relieve me".

Monach Isles 

The islands are low-lying and fertile, and their population in the 18th century may have been about 100. At the time they were owned by Sir Alexander MacDonald of Sleat, and Lady Grange was housed with his tacksman, another Alexander MacDonald, and his wife. When she complained about her condition, she was told by her host that he had no orders to provide her with either clothes, or food other than the normal fare he and his wife were used to. She lived in isolation for two years, not even being told the name of the island where she was living, and it took her some time to find out who her landlord was. She was there until June 1734, when John and Norman MacLeod from North Uist arrived to move her on. They told her they were taking her to Orkney, but instead set sail for the Atlantic outliers of St Kilda.

St Kilda 
One of the more poignant ruins on the island of Hirta in the St Kilda archipelago is the site of Lady Grange's House. The "house" is in fact a large cleit or stone storage hut in the Village meadows that is said to resemble "a giant Christmas pudding". Some authorities believe it was rebuilt on the site of a larger blackhouse where she lived during her incarceration, although in 1838 the grandson of a St Kildan who had assisted her quoted the dimensions as being "20 feet by 10 feet" (7 metres by 3 metres), which is roughly the size of the cleit.

When Martin Martin visited the islands in 1697, the only means of making the journey was by open longboat, which could take several days and nights of rowing and sailing across the open ocean and was next to impossible in autumn and winter. In all seasons, waves up to 12 metres (40 ft) high lash the beach of Village Bay, and even on calmer days landing on the slippery rocks can be hazardous. Cut off by distance and weather, the natives knew little of the rest of the world.

Lady Grange's circumstances were correspondingly more uncomfortable and no-one on the island spoke any English. She described Hirta as "a viled neasty, stinking poor Isle" and insisted that "I was in great miserie in the Husker but I'm ten times worse and worse here".  Her lodgings were very primitive. They had an earthen floor, rain ran down the walls and in winter snow had to be scooped out in handfuls from behind the bed. She spent her days asleep, drank as much whisky as was available to her, and wandered the shore at night bemoaning her fate. During her sojourn on Hirta she wrote two letters relating her story, which eventually reached Edinburgh. One, dated 20 January 1738, found its way to Thomas Hope of Rankeillor, her lawyer, in December 1740. Some sources state that the first letter had been hidden in some yarn that was collected as part of a rent payment and taken to Inverness and thence to Edinburgh. The idea of the letter's concealment in yarn is also mentioned by James Boswell in his Journal of a Tour to the Hebrides (1785). However, Macaulay states that this method for the delivery of the letter(s) has "no basis in reality" and that both letters were smuggled off Hirta by Roderick MacLennan, the island's minister. Whatever its route, the letter caused a sensation in Edinburgh although James Erskine's friends managed to block attempts by Hope to obtain a warrant to search St Kilda.

In the second letter, addressed to Dr Carlyle, minister of Inveresk, Lady Grange writes bitterly of the roles of Lord Lovat and Roderick MacLeod in her capture and bemoans being described by Sir Alexander MacDonald as "the cargo". Hope had known of Lady Grange's removal from Edinburgh but had assumed she would be well cared for. Appalled by her condition, he paid for a sloop with twenty armed men on board to go to St Kilda at his own expense. It had already set sail by 14 February 1741, but it arrived too late. Lady Grange had been removed from the island, probably in the summer of 1740.

After the Battle of Culloden in 1746, it was rumoured that Prince Charles Edward Stuart and some of his senior Jacobite aides had escaped to St Kilda. An expedition was launched, and in due course British soldiers were ferried ashore to Hirta. They found a deserted village, as the St Kildans, fearing pirates, had fled to caves to the west. When they were persuaded to come down, the soldiers discovered that the isolated natives knew nothing of the Prince and had never heard of King George II either. Paradoxically, Lady Grange's letters and her resultant evacuation from the island may have prevented her being found by this expedition.

Skye 

By 1740 Lady Grange was 61 years old. Removed from St Kilda in haste, she was transported to various locations in the Gàidhealtachd including possibly Assynt in the far north west of mainland Scotland and the Outer Hebridean locations of Harris and Uist before arriving at Waternish on Skye in 1742. Local folklore suggests she may have been kept for 18 months in a cave either at Idrigill on the Trotternish peninsula or on the Duirinish coast near the stacks known as a "Macleod's Maidens". She was certainly later housed with Rory MacNeil at Trumpan in Waternish. She died there on 12 May 1745, and MacNeil had her "decently interred" the following week in the local churchyard. Other sources state she died in a humble cottar's cottage at Idrigill in June 1749.

For reasons unknown a second funeral was held at nearby Duirinish some time thereafter, where a large crowd gathered to watch the burial of a coffin filled with turf and stones.

It is sometimes stated that this was her third funeral, Lord Grange having conducted one in Edinburgh shortly after her kidnapping. However, this story first appears in writing in 1845 and no other evidence of its veracity has emerged.

Motivations 
Lady Grange's story is a remarkable one and various issues have been raised by Macaulay (2009) as requiring explanation. These include: what drove James Erskine to these extraordinary lengths?; why were so many individuals willing to participate in this illegal and dangerous kidnapping of his wife?; and  how was she held for so long without rescue?

The first and second of these issues are related. Erskine's brother had already been exiled for his support of the Jacobites. Simon Fraser, Lord Lovat, a key figure in Lady Grange's abduction was himself executed for his part in the Jacobite Rising of 1745. No concrete evidence of Erskine's plotting against the crown or government has ever emerged, but any threat of such exposure, whether based in fact or fantasy would certainly have been taken very seriously by all concerned. It was thus relatively easy for Erskine to find accomplices amongst the Highland gentry. In addition to Simon Fraser and Alexander Macdonald of Sleat, the Sobieski Stuarts listed Norman MacLeod of Dunvegan—who became known as "The Wicked Man"—amongst the senior accomplices.
Erskine himself was a "singular compound of good and bad qualities". In addition to his legal career he was elected to Parliament in 1734 and he survived the vicissitudes of the Jacobite rebellions unscathed. He was a philanderer and over-partial to claret, whilst at the same time deeply religious. This last quality would have been instrumental in any decision not to have his wife assassinated, and he did not marry his long-term partner Fanny Lindsay until after he had heard of the first Lady Grange's death.

The reason no successful rescue was ever effected lies in the remoteness of the Hebrides from the anglophone world in the early 18th century. No reliable naval charts of the area became available until 1776. Without local assistance and knowledge, finding a captive in this wilderness would have required a significant expeditionary force. Nonetheless, the lack of action taken by Edinburgh society in general and her children in particular to retrieve one of their own is remarkable. The Kirk hierarchy, for example, made no attempt to contact her or convey news of her condition to the capital, yet they could easily have done so. Whatever the call of morality and natural justice may have suggested, John Chiesley's daughter evidently did not command a sympathetic audience in her home town.

In her account of the affair, Margaret Macaulay explores 18th-century attitudes to women in general as a significant factor and notes that although numerous documents from the hands of Lord Grange's friends and supporters are still extant, not a single contemporary female view of the affair has survived, save that of Lady Grange herself. Divorces were complex and divorced mothers were rarely given custody of children. Furthermore, Lord Grange's powerful friends in both the church and the legal profession might have made this a risky endeavour. Something of James Erskine's attitude to these matters may perhaps be gleaned from the fact that for his first speech in the House of Commons he chose to oppose the repeal of various laws relating to witchcraft. Even in his day this appeared unduly conservative and his perorations were met with laughter, which effectively ended his political career before it had begun. Writing in the mid-19th century the Sobieski Stuarts told the tale from the perspective of the descendants of the Highland aristocrats who had been responsible for Chiesley's kidnap and imprisonment. They emphasise Lady Grange's personal shortcomings, although to modern sensibilities these hardly seem good reasons for a judge and Member of Parliament and his wealthy friends to organise an illegal kidnapping and life sentence.

As for Lady Grange herself, her vituperative outbursts and indulgence in alcohol were clearly important factors in her undoing. Alexander Carlyle described her  as "stormy and outrageous", whilst noting that it was in her husband's interests to exaggerate the nature of her violent emotions. Macaulay (2009) takes the view that the ultimate cause of her troubles was her reaction to her husband's infidelity. In an attempt to end his relationship with Mrs Lindsay, (who owned a coffee house in Haymarket, Edinburgh), Rachel threatened to expose him as a Jacobite sympathiser. Perhaps she did not understand the magnitude of this accusation and the danger it posed to her husband and his friends, or how ruthless their instincts of self-preservation were likely to be.

In literature and the arts 

Rachel Chiesley's tale inspired a romantic poem called "Epistle from Lady Grange to Edward D— Esq" written by William Erskine in 1798 and a 1905 novel entitled The Lady of Hirta, a Tale of the Isles by W. C. Mackenzie.  Edwin Morgan also published a sonnet in 1984 called "Lady Grange on St Kilda". The Straw Chair is a two-act play by Sue Glover, also about the time on St Kilda, first performed in Edinburgh in 1988. Burdalane is a play about these same events by Judith Adams performed in 1996 at the Battersea Arts Centre, London and on BBC Radio 4. Rachel Chiesley  inspired Andrew Drummond's fantasy novel The Books of the Incarceration of the Lady Grange (2016) and Sue Lawrence's The Unreliable Death of Lady Grange (2020).

Boswell and Johnson discussed the subject in their 1773 tour of the Hebrides. Boswell wrote: "After dinner to-day, we talked of the extraordinary fact of Lady Grange's being sent to St Kilda, and confined there for several years, without any means of relief. Dr Johnson said, if M'Leod would let it be known that he had such a place for naughty ladies, he might make it a very profitable island."

There are portraits of both James Erskine and Rachel Chiesley in the Scottish National Portrait Gallery in Edinburgh, by William Aikman and Sir John Baptiste de Medina respectively. When the writer Margaret Macaulay sought them out she discovered they had been placed together in the same cold store.

See also 
 Queen Joanna of Castile, 16th-century monarch who was declared mentally ill and confined, possibly because those around her (such as her father, Ferdinand of Aragon) wished to control her kingdom.
 Lisbeth Salander, a fictional 21st-century heroine who is declared mentally incompetent by authority figures trying to control her behaviour.
 List of kidnappings
 Tibbie Tamson, an 18th-century Scots woman, whose persecution may have led to her suicide.

Footnotes

References

Citations

Sources
 Boswell, James (1785) Journal of a Tour to the Hebrides with Samuel Johnson, LL.D. . Adelaide University. Retrieved 1 May 2010.
 Bray, Elizabeth (1996) The Discovery of the Hebrides: Voyages to the Western Isles 1745–1883. Edinburgh: Birlinn. .
 Brunton, George (1832) An Historical Account of the Senators of the College of Justice, from its Institution in 1532. London: Saunders and Benning.
 Clerk, Rev. Archibald (1845) "Parish of Duirinish, Skye". New Statistical Account of Scotland. Edinburgh and London.
 Fleming, Andrew (2005) St. Kilda and the Wider World: Tales of an Iconic Island. Bollington, Cheshire: Windgather Press. .
 Haswell-Smith, Hamish (2004) The Scottish Islands. Edinburgh: Canongate. .
 Keay, J., and Keay, J. (1994) Collins Encyclopaedia of Scotland. London: HarperCollins. .
 Laing, David (1874) "An episode in the life of Mrs. Rachel Erskine, Lady Grange, detailed by herself in a letter from St. Kilda, January 20, 1738, and other original papers". Proceedings of the Society of Antiquaries of Scotland. xi Edinburgh. pp. 593–608.
 Macaulay, Margaret (2009) The Prisoner of St Kilda: The true story of the unfortunate Lady Grange. Edinburgh: Luath. .
 Macleod, Rev. R. C. (1906) "The Macleods:  A Short Sketch Of Their Clan, History, Folk-Lore, Tales, And  Biographical Notices Of Some Eminent Clansmen". Edinburgh: Clan MacLeod Society. Retrieved 22 August 2010.
 Martin, Martin (1703) "A Voyage to St. Kilda" in A Description of The Western Islands of Scotland. Appin Regiment/Appin Historical Society. Retrieved 3 March 2007.
 Maclean, Charles (1977) Island on the Edge of the World: the Story of St. Kilda. Edinburgh: Canongate. .
 Proceedings of the Society (11 June 1877) "Lady Grange in Edinburgh 1730". Proceedings of the Society of Antiquaries of Scotland. Edinburgh.
 Quine, David (2000) St Kilda. Grantown-on-Spey: Colin Baxter Island Guides. .
 Scott, Sir Walter (1771–1832) The Journal of Sir Walter Scott From the Original Manuscript at Abbotsford. Project Gutenberg. Retrieved 14 August 2010.
 Sobieski Stuart, John and Charles Edward (1847) Tales of the Century: or Sketches of the romance of history between the years 1746 and 1846. Edinburgh.
 Steel, Tom (1988) The Life and Death of St. Kilda. London: Fontana. .

External links 
 Canmore Royal Commission on the Ancient and Historical Monuments of Scotland, Lady Grange's "house" on St Kilda

1679 births
1730s missing person cases
1745 deaths
17th-century Scottish women
17th-century Scottish people
18th-century Scottish people
18th-century Scottish women
Kidnapped British people
Scottish people who died in prison custody